Fredson Paixão Melo (born May 13, 1979) is a Brazilian mixed martial artist and Brazilian Jiu Jitsu instructor. He has competed as a featherweight in the United States with the UFC and WEC, in Japan with Deep, and in Brazil with Jungle Fight. He is a four-time Brazilian Jiu Jitsu World Champion and a Brazilian Jiu Jitsu professor, who teaches in Las Vegas, Nevada, and has affiliate schools in California and Okinawa, Japan, under the Fredson Paixao Brazilian Jiu Jitsu Association banner. He is a former member of the Gracie Barra Combat Team.

Brazilian Jiu-Jitsu
Paixão is one of the top grapplers in the world, earning his black belt under Grand Master Osvaldo Alves in 1998. He is one of only two people to ever be skipped from purple belt straight to black belt. He has won multiple World Championships as a black belt.  He took first place in the Worlds in 1998 (as a purple belt); and in 2001, 2002, and 2005 (as a black belt). In addition, he finished second (silver medal) in 2004. He is also a nine-time Brazilian National Champion.

In May 2010, Paixão defeated Caol Uno (who is a BJJ black belt, judo black belt, shoot wrestler, and UFC veteran) in a no-gi jiu-jitsu superfight at the UFC Fan Expo held in Las Vegas at UFC 114.

Mixed martial arts career
Paixão made his WEC debut at WEC 40, where he lost a unanimous decision to Wagnney Fabiano. 

In his next fight, Paixao fought Cole Province at WEC 42, where he originally suffered a split decision loss. The result was later changed to a no contest after Province tested positive for banned substances during a post-fight screening.

Paixão was expected to face Bryan Caraway on March 6, 2010, at WEC 47, but Caraway was forced off the card with an injury.  Paixão instead faced Courtney Buck and won via first round submission. Paixão eventually fought and defeated Caraway via split decision at WEC 50.

Ultimate Fighting Championship

In October 2010, World Extreme Cagefighting merged with the Ultimate Fighting Championship. As part of the merger, all WEC fighters were transferred to the UFC. Paixão has the distinction of being part of the very first featherweight fight in UFC history. His UFC debut was against Pablo Garza at The Ultimate Fighter: Team GSP vs. Team Koscheck Finale. Paixão was knocked out in the first round by a flying knee from Garza and subsequently released from the promotion. Despite that, he continues to be the personal BJJ coach to many UFC executives and fighters.

Personal life
Paixão has a daughter named Emma. He appears in the video game UFC Undisputed 3.

Mixed martial arts record

|-
| Loss
| align=center| 11–5 (1)
| Lance Palmer
| Decision (split)
| RFA 4: Griffin vs. Escudero
| 
| align=center| 3
| align=center| 5:00
| Las Vegas, Nevada, United States
| 
|-
| Loss
| align=center| 11–4 (1)
| Pablo Garza
| KO (flying knee)
| The Ultimate Fighter 12 Finale
| 
| align=center| 1
| align=center| 0:51 
| Las Vegas, Nevada, United States
|  
|-
| Win
| align=center| 11–3 (1)
| Bryan Caraway
| Decision (split)
| WEC 50
| 
| align=center| 3
| align=center| 5:00
| Las Vegas, Nevada, United States
| 
|-
| Win
| align=center| 10–3 (1)
| Courtney Buck
| Submission (rear-naked choke)
| WEC 47
| 
| align=center| 1
| align=center| 2:39
| Columbus, Ohio, United States
| 
|-
| NC
| align=center| 9–3 (1)
| Cole Province
| NC (overturned) 
| WEC 42
| 
| align=center| 3
| align=center| 5:00
| Las Vegas, Nevada, United States
|  
|-
| Loss
| align=center| 9–3
| Wagnney Fabiano
| Decision (unanimous)
| WEC 40
| 
| align=center| 3
| align=center| 5:00
| Chicago, Illinois, United States
| 
|-
| Win
| align=center| 9–2
| Mitch Coats
| Submission
| Knockout Promotions 2009
| 
| align=center| 1
| align=center| 4:58
| Boise, Idaho, United States
| 
|-
| Win
| align=center| 8–2
| Thomas Denny
| Submission (armbar)
| GFC: Evolution
| 
| align=center| 1
| align=center| 4:32
| Columbus, Ohio, United States
| 
|-
| Win
| align=center| 7–2
| Masakazu Imanari
| Decision (majority)
| Deep: 25 Impact
| 
| align=center| 3
| align=center| 5:00
| Tokyo, Japan
| 
|-
| Loss
| align=center| 6–2
| Marcos Galvão
| Decision
| Jungle Fight 6
| 
| align=center| 3
| 
| Manaus, Brazil
| 
|-
| Win
| align=center| 6–1
| Mike French
| Submission (armbar)
| GFC: Team Gracie vs. Team Hammer House
| 
| align=center| 2
| align=center| 0:42
| Columbus, Ohio, United States
| 
|-
| Win
| align=center| 5–1
| Miljan Djurasinovic
| Submission (rear-naked choke)
| Jungle Fight 5
| 
| align=center| 1
| 
| Manaus, Brazil
| 
|-
| Win
| align=center| 4–1
| Jean Robert Monier
| Submission (rear-naked choke)
| Jungle Fight 4
| 
| align=center| 3
| 
| Manaus, Brazil
| 
|-
| Win
| align=center| 3–1
| Fábio Mello
| Decision (unanimous)
| Jungle Fight 3
| 
| align=center| 3
| align=center| 5:00
| Manaus, Brazil
| 
|-
| Win
| align=center| 2–1
| Andre Rodrigues
| TKO
| Papucaia Fight 1
| 
| align=center| 
| align=center| 
| Papucaia, Brazil
| 
|-
| Loss
| align=center| 1–1
| Yoshiro Maeda
| Decision (unanimous)
| Pancrase: Brave 7
| 
| align=center| 3
| align=center| 5:00
| Osaka, Japan
| 
|-
| Win
| align=center| 1–0
| Rani Yahya
| Decision
| Jungle Fight 2
| 
| align=center| 3
| align=center| 5:00
| Manaus, Brazil
|

Championships and achievements

Grappling
Black belt in Brazilian Jiu-Jitsu under Osvaldo Alves.

4 time Brazilian Jiu-Jitsu World Champion:
1998, 2001, 2002, 2005

9 time Brazilian National Champion:
1996, 1997, 1998, 1999, 2000, 2001, 2002, 2003, 2004

See also
List of Brazilian Jiu-Jitsu practitioners

References

External links
 
 
http://www.fpbjja.com
http://www.bjjheroes.com/bjj-fighters/fredson-paixao

1979 births
Living people
Brazilian male mixed martial artists
Featherweight mixed martial artists
Mixed martial artists utilizing boxing
Mixed martial artists utilizing Brazilian jiu-jitsu
Brazilian practitioners of Brazilian jiu-jitsu
People awarded a black belt in Brazilian jiu-jitsu
Sportspeople from Rio de Janeiro (city)
Brazilian expatriate sportspeople in the United States
World Brazilian Jiu-Jitsu Championship medalists